David Ribeiro Pereira (born 23 April 1998) is a Brazilian footballer who currently plays as a midfielder for Orense.

Club career

São Paulo
In April 2017 Ribeiro was sent on loan to São Paulo from Santo André to spend the season with the reserves of São Paulo and play in the Copa Paulista with the option to be bought in the end of the season.

Ludogorets Razgrad
On 9 January 2019 Ribeiro joined on trials to the Bulgarian champions Ludogorets Razgrad on their winter camp. On 15 January he made his unofficial debut for the team in a friendly match against the Romanian team FC Botoșani. After playing in all the friendlies and leaving a good impression, on 14 February David signed with the club officially and was presented as Ludogorets players, but would spend the rest of the season with the  reserve team to gain experience in Bulgarian football.

He scored his first unofficial goal for the doubles in a friendly match against Vihar Slavyanovo played on 17 February. Ribeiro made his official debut for Ludogorets II in the Bulgarian Second League on 24 February against Lokomotiv Sofia. He scored his debut goal in the Second League on 12 April in a 2:1 host lost against Pomorie.
On 9 August he was send on loan to Botev Vratsa until end of the year. Although he played in only 5 matches until the half season due to injury, on 4 January 2020 he was expected to sign a permanent contract with Botev, but he returned to Brazil and joined Red Bull Brasil.

Career statistics

Club

Notes

Honours
Ludogorets
First Professional Football League (1): 2018–19
Bulgarian Supercup (1): 2019

References

External links
 

1998 births
Living people
Brazilian footballers
Brazilian expatriate footballers
Association football midfielders
Esporte Clube Santo André players
São Paulo FC players
PFC Ludogorets Razgrad II players
PFC Ludogorets Razgrad players
FC Botev Vratsa players
Red Bull Brasil players
First Professional Football League (Bulgaria) players
Second Professional Football League (Bulgaria) players
Brazilian expatriate sportspeople in Bulgaria
Expatriate footballers in Bulgaria
People from São Vicente, São Paulo
Footballers from São Paulo (state)